Matt Chorley is a British journalist and broadcaster who hosts a live show on Times Radio. His early career was at the Taunton Times before covering politics for the Western Morning News and the Press Association. He was subsequently political editor at MailOnline, and a political correspondent for the Independent on Sunday. He has won awards for his political podcast and digital journalism.

Early and personal life
Chorley was born in 1982 and brought up near Taunton on the Somerset Levels and attended Richard Huish College where he was head boy. He first worked at the now defunct Taunton Times.

Career
Chorley spent a decade covering politics at the Western Morning News and Press Association, as political editor at MailOnline, and as a political correspondent at The Independent on Sunday. He joined The Times in 2016 to become the editor of The Times Red Box section and podcast. At the 2020 Society of Editors' Press Awards he won the Best News Podcast Award for Red Box.

In 2019, Chorley toured his one man comedy political show, This is Not Normal, around the UK.

In June 2020, he was announced as one of the inaugural Times Radio presenters, taking on the Monday to Thursday 10 am to 1 pm slot from 29 June 2020.  Since 14 May 2021, he has also presented the show on Fridays.

At the 2020 London Press Club, Chorley won Digital Journalist of the Year for his Red Box political email newsletter and podcast for The Times. In February 2021 Chorley wss nominated for ‘radio broadcaster of the year’ at the Broadcasting Press Guild awards. In September 2022 he was nominated for “Broadcaster of the Year” at The Press Awards alongside Ros Atkins, Paul Brand and Clive Myrie.

On 30 September, 2022 Chorley appeared on the BBC One satirical television show Have I Got News For You.

References

Living people
Year of birth missing (living people)
Date of birth missing (living people)
People from Taunton
British male journalists
21st-century British journalists
British newspaper journalists
British political journalists
Daily Mail journalists
The Independent people
The Times journalists